Glycoprotein VI (platelet), also known as GPVI, is a glycoprotein receptor for collagen which is expressed in platelets.  In humans, glycoprotein VI is encoded by the GPVI gene.
GPVI was first cloned in 2000 by several groups including that of Martine Jandrot-Perrus from INSERM.

Function 
Glycoprotein VI (GP6) is a 58-kD platelet membrane glycoprotein that plays a crucial role in the collagen-induced activation and aggregation of platelets. Upon injury to the vessel wall and subsequent damage to the endothelial lining, exposure of the subendothelial matrix to blood flow results in deposition of platelets. Collagen fibers are the most thrombogenic macromolecular components of the extracellular matrix, with collagen types I, III, and VI being the major forms found in blood vessels. Platelet interaction with collagen occurs as a 2-step procedure: (1) the initial adhesion to collagen is followed by (2) an activation step leading to platelet secretion, recruitment of additional platelets, and aggregation. In physiologic conditions, the resulting platelet plug is the initial hemostatic event limiting blood loss. However, exposure of collagen after rupture of atherosclerotic plaques is a major stimulus of thrombus formation associated with myocardial infarction or stroke.

Complete or partial deficiency of GPVI in humans is a rare condition presenting as a mild bleeding disorder.

Interactions 

GPVI has been shown to interact with LYN.

See also 
 collagen receptor

References

Further reading

External links